Family Outing Season 2 was a South Korean variety show; a part of SBS's Good Sunday lineup, along with Gold Miss is Coming (골드미스가 간다). It was first aired on February 21, 2010, following the end of the first season. In early episodes, a "Family Leader"  is chosen and acts as the main host of that outing. That role has been abolished. The "Family" travels to rural parts of South Korea and helps out in the village they are staying in. The shows predecessor, Family Outing Season 1, featured a similar format, but ended because of the main host leaving and ratings dropping. This season differs from its predecessor with more focus on reality and the family aspect, and less on chores and games. This season ended on July 11, 2010 due to low ratings and was replaced with Running Man.

Synopsis 
This show is filmed over two days and one night, airing over two episodes.
Episodes vary and do not always follow the same format.

The "Family Leader", who makes all decisions for the Family for that episode, is chosen through a vote. The family then heads to their destination. Candid interviews of the members air throughout the episode, discussing their feelings of something that just aired. The "Family Leader" also begins to make every decision deciding the Family's fate. The Family arrives at their house(s) and begins that day's agenda. A challenge is presented for the Family Leader as to whether they live in a nice house or the house that is falling apart. They settle into their new home and then take part in outdoor activities and games. There is no official main host, Kim Won-hee acts as a moderator during games. The Family then returns inside to prepare dinner. The Family Leader will need to go through a challenge and if he/she succeeds, he/she will have the better dinner available. If he/she fails, the family will eat the unfilling dinner. Late into the night, the Family prepares for bed. The next morning, the "Wake-Up Mission"  takes place. Easier tasks are given to those who come out earliest and ascend to harder tasks for those who come out last. The Family is then waken up by loud techno music and flashing lights. The music continues playing as they participate in a morning exercise, followed by the "Wake-Up Mission". The mission involves finding food for breakfast and then preparing it afterwards. After breakfast, the Family completes a favor asked by the village headman. A preview of next week's episode is shown at the end of the each episode.

Cast 
The members of the second "Family" are Kim Won-hee, Yoon Sang-hyun, Shin Bong-sun, Ji Sang-ryeol, Yoona of Girls' Generation, Jo Kwon of 2AM, Taecyeon of 2PM and Kim Hee-chul of Super Junior. Jang Dong-min was added along with Kim Hee-chul during a recording on May 18, 2010. Kim Hee-chul is the eighth member of the Family, and Jang Dong-min is considered a fixed-guest.

Relations

Ratings 
Although Season 2 features many popular celebrity and idol group members, ratings of the show continues to drop. Compared to the Season 1, Season 2 is currently viewed as a failure. Rumors has been circulating about the show's cancellation since the 3rd episode, which the show's producers strongly denied. The shows fate was eventually determined and it ended after 5 months due to low ratings.

In the ratings below, the highest rating for the show will in be red, and the lowest rating for the show will be in blue.

Episode 1-9 (Good Sunday Part 1)

Episode 10-16 (Good Sunday)

Episode 17 (Good Sunday Part 2)

Critical reception 
Season 2 received mostly negative reviews from TV critics and viewers who criticized the changes made on the format of the show, the casting choice and the fact that the show became too idol-oriented with most of the airtime and attention being given to the idol group members of the cast. Viewers also complained about Season 2 being too boring and for focusing too much on the forced love-lines between SNSD's member Yoona and 2PM's member Taecyeon. Viewers complained that the love-lines are heavily scripted and doesn't suit the 'family' concept of the show. There was much comparison between Season 1 and 2, with viewers commenting that the first season was much more humorous and natural.

See also 
SBS Family Outing
SBS Good Sunday
KBS 1 Night 2 Days
MBC Infinite Challenge

Notes

References

External links 
  Family Outing 2 on the Official Good Sunday page

Seoul Broadcasting System original programming
South Korean travel television series
South Korean reality television series
South Korean variety television shows
Korean-language television shows
2008 South Korean television series debuts
2010 South Korean television series endings
2010s South Korean television series
2010 South Korean television seasons